Kim Young-bin (born 20 September 1991) is a South Korean footballer who plays as defender for Gangwon FC in K League 1.

Club career
He was selected by Gwangju FC in the 2014 K League draft.

International career
He made his debut for South Korea national football team on 9 June 2021 in a World Cup qualifier against Sri Lanka.

Club career statistics
As of 29 May 2022

References

External links 

1991 births
Living people
Association football defenders
South Korean footballers
South Korea international footballers
Gwangju FC players
Gimcheon Sangmu FC players
K League 1 players
K League 2 players